So Sedated, So Secure is the second full-length album from Darkest Hour. The album gained the attention of independent record label Victory Records, who signed them following the success of their debut. The album has since been re-released by Victory (March 7, 2006), featuring re-mixed audio, re-recorded vocals, new tracks, and artwork.

Track listing

Bonus tracks
"Be Forewarned" - 3:26   (originally recorded by Pentagram)
"Go Back To The Gym" - 1:43   (originally recorded by Battery - former band of the album's producer, Brian McTernan)
"Bear Huntin' USA" - 3:57
"Polar Bear Huntin' USA" - 4:37
"Esteban" - 1:33

"Bear Huntin' USA" was originally to be on the album but was left off. It was then released as an internet only bonus track from Darkest Hour's website. It was included again with "Polar Bear Huntin' USA" and "Estabon" on the reissue.

Personnel
John Henry - vocals
Frederick Ziomek - lead guitar
Mike Schleibaum - rhythm guitar
Billups Allen - bass
Ryan Parrish - drums, piano

References

Darkest Hour (band) albums
2001 albums
Victory Records albums
Albums produced by Brian McTernan